Matsuya may refer to:

 Matsuya (department store), Japanese department store
 Matsuya (surname)
 Matsuya Foods Co., a gyudon chain in Japan

See also 
 Matsya